Jean-François Ruchonnet (Cluses, 23 July 1965) is a Swiss watchmaker, designer and creator in luxury sector.

Jean-Francois Ruchonnet has started his career in the technical division and R&D at Chopard. After he left Chopard in 1999 he pioneered a number of 3D animations in timekeeping. During his 30 years of experience in luxury sector and watch industry he has designed for such well-known brands as De Grisogono, Breguet, TAG Heuer, etc. In 2004 he launches famous and innovative yachting-influenced watches Cabestan. Among other creations Jean-Francois Ruchonnet gave birth to such well-known watches as:
Double Tourbillon Breguet; TAG Heuer Monaco V4; Cabestan Winch Tourbillon Vertical; Scuderia Ferrari One by Cabestan; Cabestan Nostromo; Marvin Malton 160 Ronde;
Snyper One Watch. etc.

In 2011 Jean-Francois Ruchonnet (together with naval architect Jean-Jacques Coste) has entered the yachting industry with one of the most revolutionary projects 48m CXL Trimaran, the first sailing trimaran of this size ever to be built with folding hull beams.

References

10.

External links

Watch Designer Applies His Design Instincts to Yachts. The New York Times. 23 September 2011
WATCH MOVEMENT AND WATCH Patent application.
Cabestan: Beautiful Chain Driven Watch By Charlie Sorrel. 23 April 2007

1965 births
Living people
Swiss watchmakers (people)